The Lesotho Trade Union Congress (LTUC) is a national trade union center in Lesotho. The organisation was first established in 1971. The group's secretary general, Moletsane Jonathan is a veteran leader of pro-BNP labour federations.

The group supported a protest march against the Public Service Bill in 1995.

References

Trade unions in Lesotho